Whitewater recreation in British Columbia is available in most of the province. Except for north-central and northeast British Columbia, the province is mainly mountains with a correspondingly large number of rivers. The largest drainages are the Peace River in the northeast, the Fraser River from north central to southwest and the Columbia River which drains the southeast before flowing into the United States. In addition there is the massive drainage that flows into the Pacific Ocean along the entire length of the province's Coast Mountains.

The listings of whitewater opportunities are organized in keeping with Tourism BC's defined regions.

Whitewater recreation in Vancouver, Coast and Mountains
Whitewater recreation in Kootenay Rockies
Whitewater recreation in Thompson Okanagan
Whitewater recreation in Cariboo Chilcotin Coast
Whitewater recreation in Vancouver Island
Whitewater recreation in Northern BC

Complementing the fresh water whitewater are several tidal rapids located between Vancouver Island and the mainland formed as a result of the large tides found in the area.

References

Tourist attractions in British Columbia